As the Band Turns is the sixth album by R&B band Atlantic Starr, released in 1985. Following the departure of initial lead singer Sharon Bryant, As The Band sees the introduction of new vocalist Barbara Weathers. This proved to be one of the band's more successful releases, yielding several R&B hits, such as "Freak-A-Ristic," "If Your Heart Isn't In It" (written by former Average White Band vocalist Hamish Stuart), and the smash quiet storm anthem "Secret Lovers." This would be the band's last release for A&M Records after a memorable, although inconsistent, run of hits throughout the early 80's.

Track listing
 "Freak-A-Ristic" (David Lewis) - 4:05
 "Cool, Calm, Collected" (Joey Gallo, Pamela Phillips Oland, Wardell Potts, Jr.) - 4:04
 "One Love" (David Lewis, Wayne Lewis) - 3:52
 "In the Heat of Passion" (Wayne Lewis, Wardell Potts Jr., William Shelby) - 4:38
 "If Your Heart Isn't In It" (Hamish Stuart) - 4:02
 "Silver Shadow" (David Lewis, Wayne Lewis) - 4:53
 "Let's Start It Over" (Joey Gallo, Pamela Phillips Oland, Wardell Potts, Jr.) - 5:33
 "Secret Lovers" (David Lewis, Wayne Lewis) - 5:30
 "Thank You" (David Lewis, Wayne Lewis) - 4:29

Personnel

Atlantic Starr
 Barbara Weathers – lead vocals (5, 6, 8), backing vocals (6, 7, 8)
 David Lewis – guitars (1-4, 6-9), drum programming (1, 6, 8, 9), backing vocals (1, 2, 4-9), arrangements (1, 3, 6), lead vocals (2, 3, 4, 8, 9)
 Wayne Lewis – keyboards (1, 3-9), lead vocals (1, 5, 7), backing vocals (1, 2), arrangements (1, 3, 4, 6)
 Jonathan Lewis – keyboards, trombone
 Joseph Phillips – percussion
 Atlantic Starr – arrangements (4)

Additional Musicians
 John Barnes – keyboards (1, 3, 9)
 Bill Bottrell – keyboards (1), keyboard programming (1)
 Derek Nakamoto – keyboard programming (1, 3)
 William "Dr. Z" Zimmerman – keyboards (1, 7)
 Joey Gallo – keyboards (2, 4, 7), arrangements (2, 7)
 William Shelby – keyboards (4)
 Calvin Harris – keyboard programming (5)
 Rex Salas – keyboards (5)
 Craig Harris – synthesizer string programming (6, 8)
 David Cochrane – guitars (4, 9), saxophone solo (5)
 Barry "Sonjohn" Johnson – bass guitar (5, 9)
 Wardell Potts, Jr. – drums (2, 4, 7), percussion (2, 4, 7), arrangements (2, 4, 7)
 Derek Organ – drums (5)
 Paulinho Da Costa – percussion (1, 3, 5, 6, 8, 9)
 Damon Rentie – saxophone ending (5)
 Gene Page – horn arrangements (3), string arrangements (3, 5)
 Hamish Stuart – arrangements (5)
 Clare Fischer – synthesizer string arrangements and performance (6, 8), string and horn arrangements (9)
 Dana Meyers – backing vocals (4)
 Darryl Phinnessee – backing vocals (5)
 Phyllis St. James – backing vocals (5)
 Krystal Davis – backing vocals (9)
 Fonzi Thornton – backing vocals (9)

Production
 David Lewis – producer (1, 3, 5, 6, 8, 9))
 Wayne Lewis – producer (1, 3, 5, 6, 8, 9)
 Jonathan Lewis – associate producer (1, 3, 5, 6, 8, 9)
 Joey Gallo – producer (2, 4, 7)
 Wardell Potts Jr. – producer (2, 4, 7)
 Fred Law – engineer (1, 3, 9), mix assistant (1, 3, 5, 6, 8, 9), additional engineer (5, 6, 8)
 Calvin Harris – additional engineer (1, 3, 9), producer (5), engineer (5), mixing (5)
 Kevin Reach – engineer (2, 4, 7), mixing (2, 4, 7)
 Rory Young – engineer (6, 8)
 Bill Bottrell – mixing (1, 3, 5, 6, 8, 9)
 John McClain – mixing (1, 9)
 Jim Shifflett – mixing (2, 4, 7)
 Phil Walters – mix assistant (5), additional engineer (6, 8)
 Ray Bardani – additional engineer (1, 3, 5, 9)
 Bino Espinoza – assistant engineer (1, 3, 5, 9)
 Iris Cohen – assistant engineer (1, 3, 5, 9)
 Michael Dotson – assistant engineer (1, 9)
 Elmer Flores – assistant engineer (1)
 Rhys Moody – assistant engineer (1, 3, 5, 6, 8, 9)
 Karen Siegel – assistant engineer (1, 3, 5, 9)
 Marcus Williams – assistant engineer (1, 3, 9)
 Ralph Sutton – assistant engineer (3, 9)
 Tyrone Williams – assistant engineer (6, 8)
 Bernie Grundman – mastering
 Chuck Beeson – art direction
 Larry Vigon – design, painting 
 Mark Hanauer – photography 
 Cecil Parker – stylist

Studios
 Recorded at Soundcastle (Hollywood, CA); Devonshire Sound Studios and Artisan Sound Recorders (North Hollywood, CA); Hitsville U.S.A. and Studio Masters (Los Angeles, CA); Calvin Harris Studio (Encino, CA); Minot Sound (White Plains, NY); Golden Apple Media (New York, NY).
 Mixed at Hitsville U.S.A. and Studio Masters.
 Mastered at Bernie Grundman Mastering (Hollywood, CA).

References

Atlantic Starr albums
1985 albums
A&M Records albums